Nasir Kandi (also Romanized as Naşīr Kandī) is a village in Sarajuy-ye Sharqi Rural District, Saraju District, Maragheh County, East Azerbaijan Province, Iran. At the 2006 census, its population was 227, in 45 families.

References 

Towns and villages in Maragheh County